Friendly Center is a large, open-air mall located in northwestern Greensboro, North Carolina, near the interchange of Wendover Avenue and Friendly Avenue.

History
The shopping center opened in August 1957, and with its inward orientation, Friendly Center could be classified as an outdoor lifestyle center. Its anchor tenants include Belk, Macy's (formerly Thalhimer's, later Hecht's), and Sears.  Other tenants include Barnes & Noble and Old Navy, The Grande Theatre is a 16-screen multiplex cinema operated by Regal Cinemas.  It also contains Harris Teeter's flagship supermarket location encompassing 72,000 square feet (6,700 m2) and Whole Foods Market. There are specialty "foodie" stores tucked away in the back corner by Harris Teeter such as the Savory Spice Shop  and Midtown Olive Oil. It features a number of national retailers such as Banana Republic, Victoria's Secret, Bath & Body Works, Express, The GAP, Eddie Bauer, Talbots, and Birkenstock Feet First.

In early 2006, construction of "The Shops at Friendly Center" began after the nearby Burlington Industries office building was demolished.  Its opening on October 19, 2006 introduced retail shops that had not previously been present in the Piedmont Triad market such as an Apple Store, Brooks Brothers, REI, J. Crew, Coldwater Creek (closed in 2014), White House Black Market, Pendleton, J. Jill, and Johnston & Murphy.  Several chain restaurants located in the center, including P.F. Chang's, Fleming's Prime Steak House and Wine Bar, Bravo Cucina Italiana, and Mimi's Cafe. On November 8, 2006, a  Harris Teeter supermarket opened as the chain's largest in North Carolina.

On April 3, 2007, Starmount Company put Friendly Center up for sale along with most of their other commercial real estate. On October 5, 2007, CBL & Associates contracted to buy Friendly Center and all of Starmount Company's retail and office holdings.  On January 4, 2008, The Triad Business Journal  reported that CBL & Associates paid more than $200 million for Friendly Center and the Shops at Friendly Center.

References

External links
Friendly Center official site

CBL Properties
Shopping malls in Greensboro, North Carolina
Shopping malls established in 1957